The 2017 Atlético Nacional season was the 70th season in the club's history. During this season, the team took part in four competitions: Categoría Primera A, Copa Colombia, Copa Libertadores, and Recopa Sudamericana.

Players

First-team squad

Out on loan

Transfers
Source: Soccerway

In

Out

Pre-season and friendlies

Competitions

Overall

Categoría Primera A

Torneo Apertura

Note: For a complete table see the main article

Home-away summary

Match results

†: Postponed matches.

Knockout phase

Quarterfinals

Semifinals

Finals

Torneo Finalización

Note: For a complete table see the main article

Home-away summary

Match results

†: Postponed matches.

Knockout phase

Quarterfinals

Copa Colombia

Atlético Nacional qualified for the round of 16 after qualifying for the 2017 Copa Libertadores as titleholders.

Round of 16

Quarterfinals

Copa Libertadores

Group stage

Recopa Sudamericana

Statistics

Squad statistics

Source: Soccerway

Goals

Disciplinary record

References

External links
Atlético Nacional - Official Website
Soccerway - Atlético Nacional

Atlético Nacional seasons